in Kanazawa is a Japanese racing driver. He currently drives in the Super GT series in the GT300 category for Team Mugen and in Super Formula for Real Racing.

Racing record

Complete Super GT results

* Season still in progress.

Complete Formula Nippon/Super Formula results
(key) (Races in bold indicate pole position) (Races in italics indicate fastest lap)

* Season still in progress.

External links
Official website
driverdb

1987 births
Living people
Japanese racing drivers
Japanese Formula 3 Championship drivers
Super GT drivers
Super Formula drivers
Asian Le Mans Series drivers

Mugen Motorsports drivers
Nakajima Racing drivers